The sikha or shikha (IAST: śikhā; "crest"; Hindi चोटी (choTi)) means flame, powerful, ray of light, peak of a mountain. It is a name of Hindu / Indian origin, and is commonly used for females. It also means long tuft, or lock of hair, left on top or on the back of the shaven head of a male Hindu. Though traditionally all Hindus were required to wear a śikhā, today it is seen mainly among Brahmins and temple priests. In West Bengal it is called Tiki.

Hinduism
The śikhā reportedly signifies one-pointed (ekanta) focus on a spiritual goal, and devotion to God. It is also an indication of cleanliness, as well as personal sacrifice to God. According to Smriti Shastras, it is mandatory for all Hindus to keep śikhā and the first three twice-born or dvija castes (brahmins, kshatriyas and vaishyas) to wear yajnopavita (sacred thread), also called janeus, punool, or paita.
It has been said that the śikhā allows God to pull one to heaven, or at least from this material world of maya (illusion).

In his autobiography, Mohandas K. Gandhi writes about his encounter with an Swami Shraddhanand:

The śikhā was one of the few symbols of Hindus that transcended caste, language or regional barriers. Although there were variations of the style of sikha amongst communities, it was obligatory for all males.

Procedure
Traditionally, Hindu men shave off all their hair as a child in a samskāra or ritual known as the chudakarama. A lock of hair is left at the crown (sahasrara). Unlike most other eastern cultures where a coming-of-age ceremony removed childhood locks of hair similar to the śikhā in India this prepubescent hairstyle is left to grow throughout the man's life, though usually only the most religious men will continue this hairstyle.

The śikhā is tied back or knotted to perform religious rites. Only funerals and death anniversaries are performed with the śikhā untied or with dishevelled hair. Dishevelled hair is considered inauspicious, and represents times of great sorrow or calamity. In Hindu scripture, Draupadi took an oath in the assembly of the Kurus after she was molested by Dushasana that she would remain with dishevelled hair until the enemies were properly revenged. Similarly, Chanakya is said to have taken an oath to leave his śikhā untied until he humbles the Nanda kings who insulted him.

Tamil Nadu and Kerala
The Tamil word for śikhā is kudumi and traditionally it is represented in two styles. The most common kudumi (called Pin Kudumi) is identical to the śikhā, with a knotted lock of hair on the crown of the head and the rest of the hair shaved off.

Mun-Kudumi is a style where the hair is grown long in the front and knotted to the forehead. This hairstyle was popular among some Brahmin groups of South India, such as the Chozhiya, Dikshitar, and the Namboothiris of Kerala. The prominent communities in Kerala including  the Nairs and temple servants (Ambalavasi), though not Brahmins, also sported this style. 

The technique used to tie the hair into a Kudumi is as follows: The lengthy hair can be tied with the help of left thumb and index fingers. You roll up the lock of hair over the left thumb and index fingers put together by your right hand till you reach the tail end. Then hold the tail end of hair by the left thumb and index fingers and pull out the fingers with the tail end of the hair. You get the knot. After some little practice you will get a tight and neat knot.

Maharashtra
The Marathi word for śikhā is shendi.

Gallery

See also
Chonmage
Khokhol
List of hairstyles
Queue (hairstyle)
Suebian knot

References

External links
 An excellent website for further information on śikhā.
 An ISKCON handbook for monks of Krsna.
 A deity with śikhā from Nevali Cori (image).
 A boy with śikhā, sculpture, Notre Dame, France (image).
 A Vaishnava with śikhā (image).
 Ukrainian cossack with the śikhā-like oseledets (image).
 Contains images of Chief Quipuha of Guam and his top-knot.

Hindu traditions
Hairstyles
Brahmin culture
Vaishnavism